Cellieu is a commune in the Loire department in central France.

Since the 2016 reform of the administrative regions, it is located in the exact center of the new region Auvergne-Rhône-Alpes.

Population

See also
Communes of the Loire department

References

Communes of Loire (department)